Grevillea cheilocarpa is a species of flowering plant in the family Proteaceae and is endemic to a restricted area in the south-west of Western Australia. It is a shrub with silky-hairy, egg-shaped leaves with the narrower end towards the base, and yellow flowers.

Description

Taxonomy
Grevillea cheilocarpa was first formally described in 2000 by Robert Owen Makinson in the Flora of Australia, based on plant material collected in the Dragon Rocks Nature Reserve in 1984. The specific epithet (cheilocarpa) means "beak-fruited", referring to a flange on the fruit.

Distribution and habitat
Grevillea cheilocarpa usually grows in low heath and is only known from the type location and between Hyden and Varley in the Mallee biogeographic region of inland south-western Western Australia.

Conservation status
This species is listed as "not threatened", by the Government of Western Australia Department of Biodiversity, Conservation and Attractions".

See also
 List of Grevillea species

References

cheilocarpa
Proteales of Australia
Eudicots of Western Australia
Taxa named by Robert Owen Makinson
Plants described in 2000